Karpovo is a rural locality (a village) in Ufa, Bashkortostan, Russia. The population was 135 as of 2010. There are 14 streets.

References 

Rural localities in Ufa urban okrug